Ryan Andrew Kellogg (born February 4, 1994) is a Canadian professional baseball pitcher for the Wild Health Genomes of the Atlantic League of Professional Baseball.

Professional career
Kellogg was drafted by the Toronto Blue Jays in the 12th round of the 2012 MLB Draft out of Henry Street High School in Whitby, Ontario but did not sign. He attended Arizona State University, and in 2013 he played collegiate summer baseball for the Bourne Braves of the Cape Cod Baseball League, where he was named a league all-star.

Chicago Cubs
Kellogg was drafted by the Chicago Cubs in the 5th round of the 2015 MLB Draft. Kellogg signed with Chicago and was assigned to the Low-A Eugene Emeralds, where he spent the whole season, posting an 0–1 record with a 4.98 ERA in 21.1 innings pitched. In 2016, he pitched for the Single-A South Bend Cubs where he pitched to a 9–7 record with a 3.03 ERA and a 1.08 WHIP in 24 games (23 starts).

In 2017, Kellogg spent the season with the High-A Myrtle Beach Pelicans where he struggled, going 5–7 with a 5.12 ERA in 23 games (twenty starts). In 2018, Kellogg returned to Myrtle Beach, where he moved to the bullpen, compiling a 3–1 record with a 3.58 ERA in 37 relief appearances. In 2019, Kellogg remained in Myrtle Beach for a third straight season, registering a 2-8 record and 4.54 ERA with 48 strikeouts in 23 appearances.

He did not play in a game in 2020 due to the cancellation of the Minor League Baseball season because of the COVID-19 pandemic. On April 20, 2021, Kellogg was released by the Cubs. On May 3, Kellogg re-signed with the Cubs on a minor league contract. In 2021, Kellogg played in 20 games between the Double-A Tennessee Smokies and the Triple-A Iowa Cubs, recording a 4.62 ERA with 42 strikeouts in 64 innings of work. Kellogg elected free agency following the season on November 7, 2021.

Wild Health Genomes
On March 30, 2022, Kellogg signed with the Wild Health Genomes of the Atlantic League of Professional Baseball.

International career
Kellogg was selected as a member of the Canada national baseball team at the 2011 Pan American Games, 2012 18U Baseball World Championship, 2017 World Baseball Classic, 2019 Pan American Games Qualifier, and 2019 Pan American Games.

References

External links

1994 births
Living people
Arizona State Sun Devils baseball players
Bourne Braves players
Baseball pitchers
Baseball people from Ontario
Baseball players at the 2019 Pan American Games
Iowa Cubs players
Pan American Games silver medalists for Canada
Pan American Games medalists in baseball
Canadian expatriate baseball players in the United States
Eugene Emeralds players
Myrtle Beach Pelicans players
South Bend Cubs players
Sportspeople from Whitby, Ontario
Tennessee Smokies players
World Baseball Classic players of Canada
2017 World Baseball Classic players
Medalists at the 2019 Pan American Games